The 2013 Afghan Premier League was the second season of Afghan Premier League, the Afghan league for association football clubs, since its establishment in 2012. The season began on 22 August 2013 with the group stage and ended the season with the final on 11 October 2013. Toofaan Harirod head into the season as the defending champions. In the final, Shaheen Asmayee F.C. won their first title, beating Simorgh Alborz F.C., 3–1, in extra time.

Format
For the second season of the Afghan Premier League the Afghanistan Football Federation and Moby Group, the co-founders and the organizers of the league, decided to have the league start in three stages. To expand the league to the Provinces of Afghanistan the organizers decided to have stage one begin with regional tournaments which would eventually provide team selection for the eight Afghan Premier League teams. In total there will be eight different regional tournaments in May and June 2013 with each tournament featuring around four to six teams. Along with the Afghan-based regional teams there will also be one team on Afghan refugees from Iran and one team of Afghan refugees from Pakistan entering the regional round in the Center and East tournaments respectively.

The idea of the regional tournaments is to allow younger players a chance at becoming a professional footballer. At the end of the regional tournaments the best 26 players from the participating teams in each region will be selected to the Afghan Premier League team that is based in that specific region.

Finally in order to select the final 18-man squad for the official Afghan Premier League season, a special televised tournament during the holy month of ramadan called Maidan-e-Sabz will air in which judges, coaches, and even the voting fans will decide who will be the final 18 players for each team. Before this stage begins, at the beginning of ramadan, the coaches and trainers from each team will select the best 15 players out of 26 players in which during the holy month the best 15 players will play against the remaining non-selected 11 players in intra-squad matches. At the end of each week's show the television audience will be asked to send in their votes for their top player in each position and those results will be taken into consideration by the judges. The judges for this show will be certified coaches from the Afghanistan Football Federation; they will decide their top 3 players from the 11 players for each team.

Finally, the second edition of the Afghan Premier League will officially kick-off on 22 August 2013 at the Afghanistan Football Federation Stadium with the group stage going on till 27 September 2013. The semi-finals will be played in a two-legged format in October with the Final taking place on 11 October 2013.

Teams
A total of 8 teams will contest the league. All 8 teams are spread out across Afghanistan, but all the matches would be played at the Afghanistan Football Federation stadium in Kabul. The eight teams were divided into 2 groups of 4 in the 18 game total league which will conclude on 19 October 2012 with the Grand Final.

Final standings

1) Toofaan Harirod F.C.

2) Oqaban Hindukush F.C.

3) Shaheen Asmayee F.C.

4) Simorgh Alborz F.C.

5) De Abasin Sape F.C.

6) De Spin Ghar Bazan F.C.

7) Mawjhai Amu F.C.

8) De Maiwand Atalan F.C.

Teams and locations

Group stage

Group A

Group B

Knockout stage

Semi-finals

Final

Goalscorers

7 goals:
 Hamidullah Karimi (Toofaan Harirod)
 Hashmatullah Barakzai (Shaheen Asmayee)
6 goals:
 Fayaz Azizi   (Simorgh Alborz)
3 goals:
 Maroof Mohammadi (Toofaan Harirod)
 Ghulam Yaqoobi (Toofaan Harirod)
 Munirulhaq Nadim   (Simorgh Alborz)
 Zamarai Salangi (Oqaban Hindukush)
2 goals:
 Rafi Barakzai (Toofaan Harirod)
 Hashmatullah Ghaznawi (De Abasin Sape)
 Anwar (Oqaban Hindukush)
 Omeed Nasib   (Simorgh Alborz)

Awards

Champion:
(Shaheen Asmayee)

Golden Boot:
 Hamidullah Karimi (Toofaan Harirod)
 Hashmatullah Barakzai (Shaheen Asmayee)

Player of the Season:
 Hashmatullah Barakzai (Shaheen Asmayee)

References

Afghan Premier League seasons
1
Afghan
Afghan